The Hammond Arcade, at 101 S. Higgins Ave. in Missoula, Montana, was built in 1934.  It was listed on the National Register of Historic Places in 1990.

It includes aspects of Art Deco style.  It is a one-story brick commercial building with five front bays and five bays facing north.  It is topped by stepped, polychrome brick battlements.

References

National Register of Historic Places in Missoula, Montana
Art Deco architecture in Montana
Commercial buildings completed in 1934
1934 establishments in Montana